POU domain, class 4, transcription factor 2 is a protein that in humans is encoded by the POU4F2 gene.

Function 

POU4F2 is a member of the POU-domain family of transcription factors. POU-domain proteins have been observed to play important roles in control of cell identity in several systems. A class IV POU-domain protein, POU4F2 is found in human retina exclusively within a subpopulation of ganglion cells where it may play a role in determining or maintaining the identities of a small subset of visual system neurons.[supplied by OMIM]

Interactions 

POU4F2 has been shown to interact with Estrogen receptor alpha.

See also 
 BRN-3

References

Further reading

External links 
 

POU-domain proteins